The Seoul Metropolitan Council is the local council of Seoul.

There are a total of 112 members, with 101 members elected in the First-past-the-post voting system and 11 members elected in Party-list proportional representation.

Current composition 

Negotiation groups can be formed by 10 or more members.

List of council members

Organization 
The structure of Council consists of:
Chairman
Two Vice Chairmen
Standing Committees
Council Steering Committee
Administration & Autonomy Committee
Planning & Economy Committee
Environment & Water Resources Committee
Culture, Sports & Tourism Committee
Health & Social Affairs Committee
Public Safety & Construction Committee
City Planning & Management Committee
Transportation Committee
Education Committee
Special Committees
Special Committees on Budget & Accounts
Special Committees on Ethics

Recent election results

2018 

|- style="text-align:center;"
! rowspan="2" colspan="3" width="200" | Party
! colspan="4" | Constituency
! colspan="4" | Party list
! colspan="2" | Total seats
|- style="text-align:center;"
! width="70" | Votes
! width="40" | %
! width="40" | Seats
! width="32" | ±
! width="70" | Votes
! width="40" | %
! width="40" | Seats
! width="32" | ±
! width="40" | Seats
! width="32" | ±
|-
| width="1" style="background-color:" |
| style="text-align:left;" colspan=2| Democratic Party of Korea
| 3,022,905 || 61.89 || 97 || 25
| 2,523,110 || 50.92 || 5 || 0
| 102 || 25
|-
| width="1" style="background-color:" |
| style="text-align:left;" colspan=2| Liberty Korea Party
| 1,400,927 || 28.68 || 3 || 21
| 1,250,856 || 25.24 || 3 || 2
| 6 || 23
|-
| width="1" style="background-color:" |
| style="text-align:left;" colspan=2| Bareunmirae Party
| 419,635 || 8.59 || 0 || new
| 569,224 || 11.48 || 1 || new
| 1 || new
|-
| width="1" style="background-color:" |
| style="text-align:left;" colspan=2| Justice Party
| colspan=4 
| 480,371 || 9.69 || 1 || 1
| 1 || 1
|-
| width="1" style="background-color:" |
| style="text-align:left;" colspan=2| Party for Democracy and Peace
| 10,668 || 0.22 || 0 || new
| 43,839 || 0.88 || 0 || new
| 0 || new
|-
| width="1" style="background-color:" |
| style="text-align:left;" colspan=2| Green Party Korea
| colspan=4 
| 37,974 || 0.76 || 0 || 0
| 0 || 0
|-
| width="1" style="background-color:" |
| style="text-align:left;" colspan=2| Minjung Party
| 12,989 || 0.27 || 0 || new
| 17,249 || 0.34 || 0 || new
| 0 || new
|-
| width="1" style="background-color:" |
| style="text-align:left;" colspan=2| Korean Patriots' Party
| 789 || 0.02 || 0 || new
| 15,726 || 0.31 || 0 || new
| 0 || new
|-
| width="1" style="background-color:grey" |
| style="text-align:left;" colspan=2| Other parties
| 1,537 || 0.03 || 0 || 0
| colspan=4 
| 0 || 0
|-
| width="1" style="background-color:" |
| style="text-align:left;" colspan=2| Independents
| 14,560 || 0.30 || 0 || 0
| colspan=4 
| 0 || 0
|-
|- style="background-color:#E9E9E9"
| colspan=3 style="text-align:center;" | Total
| 4,884,010 || 100.00 || 100 || –
| 4,954,933 || 100.00 || 10 || –
| 110 || –
|}

See also 
Seoul Metropolitan Government
 Seoul City Hall

References 

Government of Seoul
Provincial councils of South Korea